Anders Carlson (born June 16, 1998) is an American football placekicker for the Auburn Tigers. As a placekicker, he has been recognized as both a high school and collegiate All-American, as well as an All-Southeastern Conference (SEC) First Team and Lou Groza Award semifinalist selection.

High school career 
Carlson attended and played football, soccer, and basketball at The Classical Academy (Titans) in Colorado Springs, Colorado. In 2014, as a sophomore, he made four of six field goal attempts with a long of 44 yards, as well as nine out of 10 PATs. In 2015, as a junior, he made 11 of 18 field goal attempts with a long of 52 yards, and 37 of 38 PATs. In 2016, as a senior, he made 13 of 23 field goal attempts, including a long of 51 yards, and all 49 of his PATs.

Carlson was invited to and played in the 2017 Under Armour All-America Game. A three-star college prospect was the highest-rated prep kicker recruit in the nation coming out of high school. ESPN rated him a top-10 overall recruit prospect in the state of Colorado. He committed to play college football for the Auburn Tigers over scholarship offers from Oklahoma State and Vanderbilt.

As a soccer player, Carlson helped the Titans to the 2014 and 2015 Class 4A State finals.

College career

2017 season 
In 2017, Carlson redshirted his true freshman football season at Auburn as he served as the backup placekicker to his older brother, Daniel.

2018 season 
In 2018, prior to his redshirt freshman, Carlson gained attention after kicking a 62-yard field goal at Auburn's practice facility. That season, he successfully converted 15 of 25 field goal attempts, including two 53-yard field goals, which were the second-longest field goals made in Auburn program history by a freshman. He also converted all 44 extra-point attempts (PATs), including going 9-for-9 in the 2018 Music City Bowl against Purdue. He further forced 51 touchbacks on 70 total kickoffs. On November 24, 2018, against in-state rival Alabama, he recorded his first and only career reception, a 3-yard catch on a fake field goal play.

2019 season 
In 2019, Carlson entered his redshirt sophomore season as an SEC Media Preseason All-SEC Second Team and SEC Coaches Preseason All-SEC Third Team placekicker. He earned SEC Special Teams Player of the Week honors after making all four of his field goal attempts – from 43 (twice), 44, and 52 yards – in Auburn’s 48-45 upset win over Alabama in the “Iron Bowl.” His 52-yard field goal attempt against Alabama tied his brother, Daniel, and Al Del Greco, for Auburn’s longest field goal ever in Iron Bowl history. His third PAT made against Arkansas set an NCAA record for consecutive successful PATs (303) by Auburn kickers; a streak started by former Auburn kicker, Cody Parkey, in 2013 and that spanned six seasons, 78 games, and five different Auburn kickers. He finished his 2019 campaign by making 18 out of 25 field goal attempts and 48 out of 49 PATs, as well as 47 touchbacks on 78 kickoffs.

2020 season 
In 2020, entering his redshirt junior season, Carlson was selected to the SEC Media Preseason All-SEC Third Team and the Phil Steele All-SEC Fourth Team. That season, he made 20 out of 22 field goal attempts, including a long of 50 yards, and 24 out of 25 PATs. He was twice selected to the Lou Groza “Star of the Week” list for his kicking efforts against Arkansas and Mississippi State.

His 2020 season performance earned him Lou Groza Award (best placekicker in college football) semifinalist, American Football Coaches Association (AFCA) FBS Coaches’ All-America Second Team, Phil Steele All-America Honorable Mention, and Associated Press (AP) All-SEC First Team honors.

2021 season 
In 2021, as a redshirt senior, he made 14 of 21 field goal attempts with a long of 49 yards, as well as 35 of 36 PATs. On November 13, in Auburn’s game against Mississippi State, he suffered a season-ending torn ACL.

Carlson’s career performance places him with the fifth-most points (275), third-most field goals made (53), and sixth-most PATs made (116) in Auburn program history.

Carlson earned Special Teams MVP honors for Auburn’s 2018, 2019, and 2021 “A-Day” spring football games. Auburn's 2020 A-Day was cancelled due to the COVID-19 pandemic.

Personal life 
Carlson was born to parents, Jodie and Hans, in Colorado Springs, Colorado. He has two brothers, Nils and Daniel. Daniel, is the placekicker for the Las Vegas Raiders of the National Football League (NFL) and was also an All-American kicker at Auburn.

In 2017, as a freshman at Auburn, he earned Academic Top Tiger and SEC First-Year Academic Honor Roll recognition. In both 2018 and 2019, he earned AD Honor Roll honors. He earned SEC Academic Honor Roll recognition every year from 2018 to 2020. In both 2019 and 2020, he earned CoSIDA Academic All-District honors.

In 2020, he graduated from Auburn with a degree in aviation from the university's College of Business. He is now pursuing his master's degree.

References

External links 
Anders Carlson, Auburn Tigers bio

Auburn Tigers football players
American football placekickers
Players of American football from Colorado Springs, Colorado
1998 births
Living people